Vi Menn, (English: Us Men) is Europe and Norway's largest weekly lifestyle magazine for men. Founded in 1951 the magazine is one of the earliest publications targeting men. It is based in Oslo, Norway.

History and profile
Vi Menn was established in 1951. The magazine covers articles on a wide range of topics, including: adventure, war stories, travel, hunting, sports and cars. It is owned by the Egmont Group. The magazine is published weekly by Egmont Publishing. Its editor-in-chief is Alexander Øystå. The headquarters of Vi Menn is in Oslo.

In 1999 Vi Menn was the best-selling men's magazine in Norway with a circulation of 108,000 copies. The magazine sold 96,827 copies in 2007.

See also
List of Norwegian magazines

References

External links

1951 establishments in Norway
Lifestyle magazines
Magazines established in 1951
Magazines published in Oslo
Men's magazines
Norwegian-language magazines
Weekly magazines published in Norway